Events from the year 1942 in Scotland.

Incumbents 

 Secretary of State for Scotland and Keeper of the Great Seal – Tom Johnston

Law officers 
 Lord Advocate – James Reid
 Solicitor General for Scotland – Sir David King Murray

Judiciary 
 Lord President of the Court of Session and Lord Justice General – Lord Normand
 Lord Justice Clerk – Lord Cooper
 Chairman of the Scottish Land Court – Lord Gibson

Events 
 19 January – a Catalina flying boat crashes on the hill above Burravoe on Yell, Shetland, killing seven of her ten passengers.
 April – Allied commandos training with live ammunition accidentally cause a major pine forest fire at Loch Arkaig.
 28 April – Strathpeffer spa hospital (a hotel until 1940) is destroyed by fire.
 15 May –  arrives at Greenock with nearly 10,000 U.S. troops aboard.
 July – military scientists begin testing of anthrax as a biological warfare agent on Gruinard Island.
 25 August – Dunbeath air crash: Prince George, Duke of Kent, brother of George VI, is among 14 killed in a military air crash near Caithness.
 South Ford Bridge completed, connecting Benbecula to South Uist.
 Monach Islands deserted. Lighthouse on Shillay unlit.

Births 
 5 January – Henry John Burnett, murderer, last man hanged in Scotland (died 1963)
 24 January – Sheila Mullen, painter
 2 February – Roger Hynd, footballer (died 2017)
 21 February – Magnus Linklater, journalist
 22 February – John Kerr, Baron Kerr of Kinlochard, diplomat
 24 February – Stuart Henry, disc jockey (died 1995 in Luxembourg)
 27 February – Aimi MacDonald, actress and dancer
 12 April – Bill Bryden, theatre director
 28 April – Geoffrey Hosking, historian
 8 May – Norman Lamont, Conservative politician, Chancellor of the Exchequer
 14 May – Prentis Hancock, actor
 24 May – Fraser Stoddart, Scottish-born scientist, recipient of the Nobel Prize in Chemistry
 7 June – Aonghas MacNeacail, Gaelic poet (died 2022)
 18 June – John Bellany, painter (died 2013)
 12 July – Tam White, actor and musician (died 2010)
 8 August – Dennis Canavan, politician
 12 August – Iain Blair, actor and author (using the pen name Emma Blair) (died 2011 England)
 23 October – Douglas Dunn, poet and academic
 16 November – Willie Carson, jockey
 24 November – Billy Connolly, comedian
 9 December – Billy Bremner, international footballer (died 1997)
 10 December – Ann Gloag, born Ann Souter, entrepreneur
 12 December – Morag Hood, actress (died 2002 London)
 13 December – Hamish Wilson, actor
 22 December - Irvine Laidlaw, Baron Laidlaw, businessman
 27 December – Mike Heron, psychedelic rock musician (The Incredible String Band)
 Albert Watson, photographer

Deaths 
 2 March  - Charles Usher, ophthalmologist from whom Usher Syndrome is named (born 1865)
 3 March - George Adam Smith, theologian (born 1856 in Calcutta)
 10 August – Bob Kelso, footballer (born 1865)
 4 December – Hugh Malcolm, Royal Air Force officer, posthumous recipient of the Victoria Cross (born 1917; killed in action over Tunisia)
 Andrew Allan, lithographic artist (born 1863)

The arts
 Ena Lamont Stewart's first play, the one-act Distinguished Company, is presented by the MSU Repertory Theatre in Rutherglen.

See also 
 Timeline of Scottish history
 1942 in Northern Ireland

References 

 
Years of the 20th century in Scotland
Scotland
1940s in Scotland